Golam Sarwar Milon is a Jatiya Party (Ershad) politician and the former Member of Parliament of Manikganj-4.

Career
Milon was elected to parliament from Manikganj-4 as a Jatiya Party candidate in 1986 and 1988.

Milon was the first President of Bangladesh Jatiotabadi Chatra Dal. He was a State Minister in the Cabinet of President Hossain Mohammad Ershad. He joined Bikalpa Dhara Bangladesh in October 2018.

References

Jatiya Party politicians
Living people
3rd Jatiya Sangsad members
4th Jatiya Sangsad members
Bikalpa Dhara Bangladesh politicians
Bangladesh Nationalist Party politicians
Year of birth missing (living people)